Annette Krier (born 10 August 1937) is a Luxembourgian gymnast. She competed in five events at the 1956 Summer Olympics.

References

1937 births
Living people
Luxembourgian female artistic gymnasts
Olympic gymnasts of Luxembourg
Gymnasts at the 1956 Summer Olympics
Sportspeople from Luxembourg City